Paul Henry Beaver Jr. (August 14, 1925 – January 16, 1975) was an American musician who was a pioneer in popular electronic music, using the Moog synthesizer.  From 1967, Beaver collaborated with Bernie Krause as the recording duo Beaver & Krause.

Early life and career
Born in Columbiana, Ohio, Paul Beaver studied classical music and learned the organ, before acquiring technical knowledge of electronics while serving in the US Navy in World War II.  After the war, he played the organ at the Angelus Temple in Los Angeles, made music and special effects for movies such as The Magnetic Monster (1953), and became a technical consultant to the Hammond Organ Company.  He also became a successful session musician, had his own recording studio, and rented out musical instruments from his collection.

Work with Bernie Krause

Beaver was the electronic half of a 1965 experimental free-form album for Dunhill Records with studio drummer Hal Blaine called "Psychedelic Percussion".   In 1966, he was approached by Jac Holzman of Elektra Records, who wished to make an album that used electronic music in a format that would appeal to the emerging hippie culture.  Holzman introduced Beaver to Bernie Krause, another synthesizer enthusiast.  They decided to pool their savings to buy a Moog synthesizer, and agreed to work together on the project, alongside composer and arranger Mort Garson.  The result was the album The Zodiac: Cosmic Sounds.

They continued to work together in a project to master the new Moog synthesizer and present it as a viable instrument for film and recording work.  From 1967, Beaver collaborated with Krause as the recording duo Beaver & Krause. They were one of the first groups to record pop-commercial electronic music, which later became known as electronica. Their double album The Nonesuch Guide to Electronic Music, issued on Jac Holzman's Nonesuch record label, was a landmark work, introducing the public to the full range of individual sounds that the Moog could make, and in great detail.

As Robert Moog's sales representatives on the U.S. West Coast, they attracted limited industry interest until the Monterey Pop Festival in June 1967, when musicians and artists' representatives visited their stall and began placing orders for Moogs. Over the next two years, Beaver played a key role in popularizing the instrument in rock music and in film and television. During that time, he undertook a steady stream of session work for their Moog customers and led workshops attended by film composers and session keyboardists.

Among his many appearances on recordings by pop and rock acts, Beaver played the Moog on  "Star Collector", the final song on The Monkees' Pisces, Aquarius, Capricorn & Jones Ltd. album, released in November 1967, and on The Byrds' "Goin' Back", from their 1968 album The Notorious Byrd Brothers. He also contributed to the Elektra Records 1966 release The Zodiac: Cosmic Sounds, an album that is widely recognised as the first recording in the genre to feature the Moog synthesizer.

Beaver was a friend and associate of George Martin, and he aided in the production of The Beatles' Magical Mystery Tour album, supplying the first-generation Hammond B3 organ which provided the strange sound effect at the end of "Blue Jay Way" (accomplished by switching the motorized 'tone wheel' off and on). During this time he and musician-engineer Phil Davis built a custom polyphonic Moog modular synthesizer, based on the Moog Apollo prototype, for Keith Emerson of Emerson, Lake & Palmer that was one of the first electronic instruments to have programmable preset sounds, controlled by an auxiliary 8-bit computer which used a TV monitor. In addition, Beaver, together with associates Phil Davis and Dan Wyman, worked alongside composer Alexander Courage, composing and performing incidental ambient music ("The Cage" and others) and creating several sound effects for the original Star Trek television series.

Beaver & Krause continued releasing electronic albums, first for Mercury Records' spin-off label, Limelight, with their album Ragnarok (1968), then three albums for Warner Bros. Records: In a Wild Sanctuary (1970), Gandharva (1971), and All Good Men (1972). Combining the Moog with acoustic instruments, these albums were effectively the beginning of the "New Age" musical movement. The ending of the track "Spaced", from the Wild Sanctuary album, which features two synthesizers simultaneously gliding up and down to merge into a final single chord, was later re-performed to become the musical soundtrack for the original THX logo used in movie theatres.    With Ruth White, Beaver established the Electronic Music Association in the 1970s.

Personal life and death
Beaver was a Scientologist, a right-wing Republican, unmarried, and a bisexual proponent of sexual liberation.
His health began to deteriorate in 1973. He died of a cerebral aneurysm in January 1975, at the age of 49, while working on a revised version of The Nonesuch Guide.

Legacy
Writing on his website Head Heritage (under his pseudonym "the Seth Man"), musician and musicologist Julian Cope describes Beaver as "one of the first and most unique American synthesizer players".  Tom Oberheim said of Beaver that "other than Carlos, [he was] probably the person most responsible for getting the synthesizer thing going."

Discography

With The Beach Boys
Sunflower (Brother/Reprise, 1970)

With Quincy Jones
Smackwater Jack (A&M, 1971)

With Lalo Schifrin
Music from Mission: Impossible (Dot, 1967)
There's a Whole Lalo Schifrin Goin' On (Dot, 1968)

References

1925 births
1975 deaths
American electronic musicians
20th-century American keyboardists